Urmas Kaldvee (born 20 November 1961) is an Estonian biathlete. He competed at the 1992 Winter Olympics and the 1994 Winter Olympics.

References

External links
 

1961 births
Living people
Estonian male biathletes
Olympic biathletes of Estonia
Biathletes at the 1992 Winter Olympics
Biathletes at the 1994 Winter Olympics
Sportspeople from Võru